St Francis Hospital is a Provincial government funded TB hospital for the Walter Sisulu Local Municipality area in Aliwal North, Eastern Cape in South Africa. Previously, it was a Provincially Aided Hospital (until December 2010).

The hospital departments include Pharmacy, Anti-Retroviral (ARV) treatment for HIV/AIDS, TB Services, Physiotherapy, Out Patients Department, Laundry Services and Kitchen Services.

References
 Eastern Cape Department of Health website - Joe Gqabi District Hospitals

Hospitals in the Eastern Cape
Joe Gqabi District Municipality